Aleksandr Lobanov (born 4 January 1986) is an Uzbekistani football goalkeeper of Russian origin who plays for Pakhtakor Tashkent in the Uzbek League.

Career
He started his playing career at Sogdiana Jizzakh in 2005. In 2007, he moved to Kazakhstani club Kaisar. Lobanov joined Pakhtakor Tashkent in 2012 and signed a 3-year contract.

Persepolis
In January 2016, Lobanov signed a six-month contract with Persian Gulf Pro League side Persepolis. He was assigned the shirt number 55. He recorded his first clean–sheet for Persepolis on 12 February 2016 in a 1–0 win over Foolad.

International
A dual citizen of Uzbekistan and Kazakhstan, and with his Russian birth, he could represent for Uzbekistan, Kazakhstan and Russia. He chose the former.

Even though Lobanov has been called to Uzbekistan many times, he made his official debut for national team on 3 September 2015 in 2018 World Cup qualifying match against Yemen in the starting eleven.

Statistics

Club career statistics

Honours

Club
 Uzbek League (3): 2012, 2014, 2015

Persepolis
Persian Gulf Pro League runner-up: 2015–16

References

External links

 Aleksandr Lobanov at Footballzz
 Alexander Lobanov at Eurosport
 
 

1986 births
Living people
Uzbekistani footballers
Uzbekistan international footballers
Uzbekistani expatriate footballers
Pakhtakor Tashkent FK players
PFK Metallurg Bekabad players
Footballers at the 2006 Asian Games
Sportspeople from Tashkent
Uzbekistani people of Russian descent
Association football goalkeepers
Expatriate footballers in Iran
Expatriate footballers in Kazakhstan
Uzbekistani expatriate sportspeople in Iran
Uzbekistani expatriate sportspeople in Kazakhstan
Asian Games competitors for Uzbekistan